Sly Fox is a comedic play by Larry Gelbart, based on Ben Jonson's Volpone.

Sly Fox may also refer to:
 Sly Fox (band), an American new wave duo
 Sly Fox (horse), an American Thoroughbred racehorse
 Sly Fox (solitaire), a solitaire card game played with two decks of 52 playing cards each
 Sly Fox (song), a song by American rapper Nas from his untitled ninth album
 Sly Fox Brewery, a Pennsylvania brewery